Humulus le muet is a 1948 play by French dramatist Jean Anouilh.

Plays by Jean Anouilh
1948 plays